The Martin-Luther-Schule (MLS) is a secondary school ("Gymnasium") with the main focus on the subject of music. It is located in Rimbach, is a village in the "Weschnitztal" in Germany. With approximately 1,600 students, the MLS is one of the biggest schools in the "Kreis Bergstraße". The school was founded in 1887.

Buildings 
The MLS includes seven buildings. Each faculty has its own.

Description of buildings:
 A-Building: office and organization; normal classrooms
 B-Building: the media centre and computer rooms; library; normal classrooms
 C-Building: natural science rooms; collection of natural science material
 D-Building: music rooms; collection of musical instruments; rooms for art lessons; collection of art material
 E-Building: classrooms for the upper school; kitchen; lockers; called “pavilion”
 F-Building: provisional building for the upper class called “container”
 G-Building: provisional building for the upper class

With the building of a newer school, only the A-Building will exist in the future.

References 

Bergstraße (district)
Schools in Hesse
Educational institutions established in 1887
1887 establishments in Germany